Daniel Spitz (born July 31, 1990) is a retired American mixed martial artist. A professional competitor from 2013 until 2019, he competed for King of the Cage and the UFC.

Background
Spitz was born in Spokane, Washington, United States. He attended Mead High School, where he starred in football as a defensive lineman and tight end. Spitz later continued playing football as an offensive lineman for Washington State University, weighing 302 lbs. at the time, and earned a degree in Psychology. After his collegiate football career was over, he transitioned to MMA as he wanted to stay physically active. He trained under Rick Little and after one month of training, he competed in his first amateur fight. He was instantly hooked after his fight competition and never look back since. He trains at Sikjitsu in Spokane and his teammates are UFC fighters Michael Chiesa, Julianna Pena, and Sam Sicilia.

Mixed martial arts career

Early career
After compiling a 5-1 amateur record, Spitz fought all his fights in the United States for Excite Fight, King of the Cage (KOTC) and Conquest of the Cage (COTC) promotions. His notable win came over former notable UFC veteran Wesley Correira and he amassed a record of 5-0 prior to joining the UFC.

Ultimate Fighting Championship
In his UFC debut, Spitz faced Mark Godbeer, replacing Todd Duffee, on a 9-day notice, on March 4, 2017, at UFC 209 in Las Vegas. He lost the fight via unanimous decision.

On September 16, 2017, Spitz stepped into the octagon for his second UFC fight against Anthony Hamilton at UFC Fight Night 116. He won the fight via technical knockout in 24 seconds on round one.

Spitz faced Walt Harris on June 1, 2018, at UFC Fight Night 131. He lost the fight via in second round.

Spitz was scheduled to face Jeff Hughes on March 9, 2019, at UFC on ESPN+ 4. However, Spitz pulled out of the fight in February citing injury and he was replaced by Maurice Greene.

Spitz faced promotional newcomer Tanner Boser on October 18, 2019, at UFC on ESPN 6. He lost the fight via unanimous decision. Spitz was subsequently released from the promotion.

Spitz was released by the UFC on February 11, 2020.

Personal life
Spitz went to Washington State University and earned a degree in Psychology and a minor in businesses study.
He worked full-time at Starbucks and part-time as a bouncer prior signed by UFC.
Spitz has a tight knit group of friends from his childhood he affectionately calls "The QuadPod". Spitz loves water related sport activities and he is a boxing fan.

Mixed martial arts record

|-
|Loss
|align=center|6–3
|Tanner Boser
|Decision (unanimous)
|UFC on ESPN: Reyes vs. Weidman 
|
|align=center|3
|align=center|5:00
|Boston, Massachusetts, United States
|
|- 
| Loss
| align=center|6–2
| Walt Harris
| TKO (punches)
| UFC Fight Night: Rivera vs. Moraes
| 
| align=center|2
| align=center|4:59
| Utica, New York, United States
|
|-
| Win
| align=center| 6–1
| Anthony Hamilton
| TKO (punches)
| UFC Fight Night: Rockhold vs. Branch
| 
| align=center| 1
| align=center| 0:24
| Pittsburgh, Pennsylvania, United States
|
|-
| Loss
| align=center| 5–1
| Mark Godbeer
| Decision (unanimous)
| UFC 209
| 
| align=center| 3
| align=center| 5:00
| Las Vegas, Nevada, United States
|
|-
| Win
| align=center| 5–0
| Colton Vaughn
| TKO (injury)
| KOTC: Fall Out
| 
| align=center| 1
| align=center| 0:06
| Worley, Idaho, United States
|
|-
| Win
| align=center| 4–0
| Wesley Correira
| Decision (unanimous)
| RWE: Just Scrap
| 
| align=center| 3
| align=center| 5:00
| Hilo, Hawaii, United States
|
|-
| Win
| align=center| 3–0
| Trandon Benson
| Submission (rear-naked choke)
| Conquest of the Cage 21
| 
| align=center| 1
| align=center| 1:26
| Airway Heights, Washington, United States
|
|-
| Win
| align=center| 2–0
| David Lewis
| Submission (guillotine choke)
| Conquest of the Cage 21
| 
| align=center| 1
| align=center| 1:28
| Airway Heights, Washington, United States
|
|-
| Win
| align=center| 1–0
| Matt Kovacs
| Submission (arm-triangle choke)
| ExciteFight: Summer Showdown 2
| 
| align=center| 1
| align=center| 3:45
| Tulalip, Washington, United States
|
|-

See also 
 List of current UFC fighters
 List of male mixed martial artists

References

External links 
 
 

Living people
1990 births
American male mixed martial artists
Heavyweight mixed martial artists
Sportspeople from Spokane, Washington
Mixed martial artists from Washington (state)
Ultimate Fighting Championship male fighters